Greg Johnson (born 20 February 1990) is a Jamaica international rugby league footballer who plays as a er for the Batley Bulldogs in the RFL Championship.

He played for the Wakefield Trinity Wildcats and the Salford Red Devils in the Super League and Batley in the Championship. He was contracted to the Huddersfield Giants in the top flight, and spent time on loan from the Giants at the Bulldogs in the second tier.

Background
Greg Johnson was born in Huddersfield, West Yorkshire, England.

Playing career
A Jamaica international, Johnson made his Super League début for the Wakefield Trinity Wildcats in 2011 and amassed a total of 2 tries in 12 appearances.  His contract with Wakefield was immediately terminated following his conviction.

When released from prison in 2013, he was signed by the Batley Bulldogs, where he played regularly. He scored 18 tries in 28 appearances and attracted interest from the Salford City Reds, with whom he signed for the 2014 season.

Johnson established himself as a first-choice player for Salford in 2014, scoring 10 tries in 20 appearances. His first try of the season against the Widnes Vikings has been claimed to be a try of the season contender, as he bust three tackles in a run from his own half before sidestepping Rhys Hanbury to score.

Bradford Bulls
Johnson was released by the Bradford Bulls in September 2020.

Batley Bulldogs
On 2 Jul 2021 it was reported that he had signed for the Batley Bulldogs in the RFL Championship.

References

External links
Salford Red Devils profile
SL profile
Jamaica profile

1990 births
Living people
Batley Bulldogs players
Bradford Bulls players
English people of Jamaican descent
English rugby league players
Huddersfield Giants players
Jamaican rugby league players
Jamaica national rugby league team players
Rugby league players from Huddersfield
Rugby league wingers
Salford Red Devils players
Wakefield Trinity players